"A Good Run of Bad Luck" is a song co-written and recorded by American country music artist Clint Black.  It was released in February 1994 as the fourth single from his album No Time to Kill.  It reached number one on both the United States and Canadian country charts.  The song was written by Black and Hayden Nicholas. It also appeared on the 1994 soundtrack to the film Maverick.

Content
The song is an uptempo that discusses falling in love by using gambling metaphors. The narrator compares gambling to love relationships.

Music video
The music video was Clint's first that he directed himself, and premiered in early 1994. The music video shows Black and his band playing in a dark room with a bunch of cards on the floor. Also scenes from the movie Maverick, in which Clint had a cameo and whose soundtrack the song also appears on, are shown in the video.

Chart positions
"A Good Run of Bad Luck" debuted at number 54 on the U.S. Billboard Hot Country Singles & Tracks for the week of March 5, 1994.

Year-end charts

References

Songs about luck
1994 singles
Clint Black songs
Songs written by Clint Black
Songs written by Hayden Nicholas
Song recordings produced by Clint Black
Song recordings produced by James Stroud
RCA Records singles
1993 songs